Six Gun Mesa is a 1950 American Western film directed by Wallace Fox and written by Adele Buffington. The film stars Johnny Mack Brown, Gail Davis, Riley Hill, Leonard Penn, Marshall Reed and Milburn Morante. The film was released on April 30, 1950, by Monogram Pictures.

Plot

Cast          
Johnny Mack Brown as Johnny Mack Brown
Gail Davis as Lynne Gregory
Riley Hill as Dave Emmett
Leonard Penn as Carson
Marshall Reed as Bull Bradley
Milburn Morante as Whiskey Evans
Carl Mathews as Joe Lang
Bud Osborne as Marshal Hatch
George DeNormand as Steve 
Stanley Blystone as Chip Mullins 
Steve Clark as Mark Jones

References

External links
 

1950 films
American Western (genre) films
1950 Western (genre) films
Monogram Pictures films
Films directed by Wallace Fox
American black-and-white films
1950s English-language films
1950s American films